The 12th Jutra Awards were held on March 28, 2010 to honour films made with the participation of the Quebec film industry in 2009. The nominees were announced on February 16.

Winners and nominees

References

12
2009 film awards
2009 in Canadian cinema